Where Danger Lives is a 1950 film noir thriller directed by John Farrow and starring Robert Mitchum, Faith Domergue and Claude Rains.

Plot
Dr. Jeff Cameron (Mitchum) treats a mentally disturbed attempted suicide victim (Domergue).  She signs herself out of the hospital, but sends a telegram inviting him to meet her. To his surprise, he finds she lives in a mansion. He breaks a date with his nurse girlfriend, Julie (Maureen O'Sullivan), because he is worried Margo may try to commit suicide again.

The doctor falls in love with Margo and they begin seeing one another. Told she is flying to Nassau with her aged father the next day, a tipsy Jeff shows up unannounced and boldly tells Frederick Lannington (Rains) that he is in love with the man's daughter. Lannington informs him that Margo is his wife. A stunned Jeff leaves despite Margo's pleas. When he hears a scream, he returns and finds her holding an earring ripped from her ear. The naïve Jeff decides to get involved in the domestic dispute. Lannington beats Jeff with a fireplace poker.  In the ensuing struggle, Lannington is knocked down and strikes his head on the floor and falls unconscious. Dazed, Jeff goes to the bathroom; when he returns, he finds the man dead.

Jeff wants to call the police, but Margo insists they would believe it was murder. Capitalizing on the fact that Jeff's judgment is impaired by his injuries and naïvety, she persuades him to run away with her. They first try to use the airline tickets, but spot policemen at the ticket desk. They decide to drive to Mexico instead, taking the precaution of trading in Margo's convertible for a pickup truck provided by larcenous used car salesman "Honest Hal". Jeff diagnoses his continuing headaches and mental fog as a concussion, warning Margo that it will lead to first paralysis of the extremities, followed by a coma within 24 to 48 hours.

In Postville, Arizona, they are taken to the sheriff, but only because Jeff is not wearing a beard for the town's "Wild West Whiskers Week". After Margo claims they are on their way to Mexico to get married, the police chief (Charles Kemper) tells them marriages are a Postville specialty and insists they get wed there. In their honeymoon suite, Margo hears a radio broadcast about them that discloses she had been undergoing psychiatric treatment. After the couple sneaks away, the police chief identifies Margo from a photograph and alerts the border patrol. It is revealed that Lannington was smothered to death with a pillow.

In a border town, the fugitives sell Margo's $9,000 bracelet to a pawnbroker for $1,000. Seeing they are anxious to avoid the police, he sends them to theater owner Milo DeLong (Philip Van Zandt), who offers to smuggle them into Mexico for $1,000. As they wait, Jeff's left side becomes paralyzed. He realizes that Margo is mentally unstable and that she killed her husband; and decides not to go to Mexico. When he tries to stop Margo from leaving she knocks him down and then smothers him, however, he is only rendered unconscious. He drags himself downstairs and to the border crossing. When Margo sees him coming she pulls her pistol out of her purse and starts shooting at him. The police return fire, fatally wounding her.  The police consider Jeff an accomplice to Lannington's murder, but before she dies she not only says she acted alone, but that Jeff "didn't even have sense enough to know."

While in hospital recovering, Jeff asks his doctor, "Can I send flowers to San Francisco?" The doctor says, "I think so," steps out into the hall and sends Julie in to see him.

Cast

 Robert Mitchum as Dr. Jeff Cameron
 Faith Domergue as Margo Lannington
 Claude Rains as Frederick Lannington
 Maureen O'Sullivan as Julie Dorn
 Charles Kemper as Postville Police Chief
 Ralph Dumke as Klauber
 Billy House as Bogardus, the Postville justice of the peace 
 Harry Shannon as Dr. Maynard
 Philip Van Zandt as Milo DeLong
 Jack Kelly as Dr. James Mullenbach, a hospital associate of Jeff's
 Lillian West as Mrs. Bogardus
 Ray Teal as Sheriff Joe Borden

Reception

Contemporary critical response
Bosley Crowther of The New York Times wrote, "Fogged a bit by several strong drinks and a couple of blows on the head, our hero does not obey his instinct but goes rushing off with the lady into the night. And thus begins a series of adventures on his flight to escape which leads him at last to realize that one should always inform the police. In this solemn demonstration, Mr. Mitchum does a fairly credible job as a man operating in a vacuum and beset by unfortunate circumstances. As the lady who gets him into trouble, Miss Domergue manifests nothing more than a comparatively sultry appearance and an ability to recite simple lines," adding that director Farrow "has previously done better—and he'd better do so again."

Modern critical response
Dave Kehr of the Chicago Reader wrote, "Director John Farrow nicely hits the nightmarish, hallucinatory qualities in this standard film noir plot: Mitchum spends the last half of the film barreling down the dirt roads of southern California with a brain concussion, passing out periodically and waking up surrounded by some of the bleakest scenery America has to offer."

Film critic Dennis Schwartz liked the film, especially the work of Mitchum, and wrote, "Robert Mitchum is cast as a stable citizen, which goes against typecast...Danger is beautifully photographed by Nick Musuraca in the dark B&W style of noir and is ably directed by John Farrow, who successfully caught the nightmarish visions. It is interesting mostly as a character study of a capable man blinded by lust, whose life is almost destroyed. Mitchum is the innocent man who is framed and doesn't realize he is innocent until it is almost too late, recovering in the nick of time because he has such a strong character and will to live. Mitchum's convincing portrayal of the innocent man on the run, is what makes this melodrama compelling...The movie plays like a noir cliché. But Mitchum saves the day, realistically showing how a swell guy and such a competent doctor could be so vulnerable. Claude Rains as always is magnificent, in a small part but one where his every gesture seems to be constrained in a maniacal rage ready to burst open. His touch of madness is best exemplified by his mischievous smile while meeting his wife's lover."

British film critic Neil Young wrote, "Though inexplicably little-known these days, Where Danger Lives is an absolutely cracking little film noir with an appealingly absurd screwball edge. The main credit for which presumably belongs not to director Farrow (father of Mia), but to veteran scriptwriter Charles Bennett - whose screenplays for Hitchcock included The 39 Steps, Young and Innocent and Foreign Correspondent, and later wrote Jacques Tourneur's Night of the Demon."

References

External links
 
 
 
 Where Danger Lives at DVD Beaver (includes images)
 Where Danger Lives at DVD Savant (includes synopsis)
 

1950 films
1950s crime thriller films
American black-and-white films
Film noir
Films scored by Roy Webb
Films directed by John Farrow
Films set in Arizona
Films set in California
1950s psychological thriller films
RKO Pictures films
American psychological thriller films
American crime thriller films
1950s English-language films
1950s American films